WBNT-FM (105.5 FM, "Hive 105") is a radio station broadcasting an adult contemporary music format. Licensed to Oneida, Tennessee, United States, the station is currently owned by Oneida Broadcasters, Incorporated and features programming from Citadel Media.

References

External links

BNT-FM
Mainstream adult contemporary radio stations in the United States
Scott County, Tennessee